Rhopalosyrphus is a genus of hoverflies, with nine known species. The adults flies mimic wasps, such as Zethus. The larvae are predators of ant brood. They are native to from southern United States to northern Argentina.

Species

Sensu stricto
Rhopalosyrphus australis Thompson, 2003
Rhopalosyrphus ecuadoriensis Reemer, 2013
Rhopalosyrphus guentherii (Lynch Arribálzaga, 1891) (= R. carolae Capelle, 1956)
Rhopalosyrphus ramulorum Weems & Deyrup, 2003
Rhopalosyrphus robustus Reemer, 2013

Sensu lato
Rhopalosyrphus abnormis (Curran, 1925)
Rhopalosyrphus abnormoides Reemer, 2013
Rhopalosyrphus cerioides (Hull, 1943)
Rhopalosyrphus oreokawensis Reemer, 2013

References

Hoverfly genera
Diptera of North America
Diptera of South America
Microdontinae
Taxa named by Ermanno Giglio-Tos